Gothic verbs have the most complex conjugation of any attested Germanic language. Most categories reconstructed for the Proto-Germanic verb system are preserved in Gothic. Knowledge of the Proto-Germanic verb is itself to a large degree based on Gothic, meaning that its reconstruction may be fragmentary.

In conjugations, note that stem-final -b- /β/ and -d- /ð/ change spelling and pronunciation to become -f /ɸ/ and -þ /θ/ respectively at the end of a word. Stem final -g- /ɣ/ also presumably became /x/, but the spelling does not change. Similarly, verb stems ending in -ái-, -áu-, -ē-, -iu-, and -ō- become -aj-, -aw, -ai-, -iw, and -au- respectively, before vowels. Expected *áij, *áuw, and *iuw are always simplified into ái, áu, and iu (respectively).

Strong verbs
Germanic language strong verbs are verbs that change the vowel in the stem to form the past and past participle, rather than add a suffix. For an English example, contrast fall-fell-fallen (strong) from fell-felled (weak).

The following is a table of all the different types and subtypes of strong verbs.

The "general" stem is used for the present tense, infinitive and imperative. The "past 1" stem is used for the past tense indicative singular, and the "past 2" is used for the dual and plural indicative past as well as the past optative past in all numbers.

Classes 5 and 6 have a small subclass of verbs that use the consonant suffix -j- in the general form, but drop it elsewhere

Reduplicating/ Class 7 strong verbs that begin with a vowel simply add aí- as a prefix, without adding a consonant to reduplicate or separate the "aí" prefix from the stem vowel.

The following strong verbs are extant in Gothic:

 Class 1: beidan "to await" (báiþ), beitan "to bite", digan "to knead", dreiban "to drive" (dráif), greipan "to seize", hneiwan "to bow", bileiban "to remain" (biláif), ga-leiþan "to go", urreisan "to arise", skeinan "to shine", disskreitan "to rend", gasmeitan "to smear", sneiþan "to cut", speiwan "to spit", steigan "to ascend", sweiban "to cease" (swáif), weipan "to crown", inweitan "to worship";
 Class 1, before h, ƕ, r: leiƕan "to lend", ga-teihan "to tell", þeihan "to thrive", þreihan "to press upon", weihan "to fight";
 Class 2a: ana-biudan "to bid" (anabáuþ), biugan "to bend", driugan "to serve as a soldier", driusan "to fall", giutan "to pour", hiufan "to mourn", dishniupan "to break asunder", kiusan "to test", kriustan "to gnash"; liudan "to grow" (láuþ), liugan "to lie", fraliusan "to lose", niutan "to enjoy", siukan "to be sick", af-skiuban "to push aside" (afskáuf), sliupan "to slip", usþriutan "to trouble";
 Class 2a, before h, ƕ, r: tiuhan "to lead", þliuhan "to flee";
 Class 2b: galūkan "to shut";
 Class 3: bindan "to bind", bliggwan "to beat", brinnan "to burn", drigkan "to drink", filhan "to hide", finþan "to find", usgildan "to repay", duginnan "to begin", hilpan "to help", frahinþan "to capture", aflinnan "to depart", rinnan "to run", siggwan "to sing", sigqan "to sink", fraslindan "to swallow up", spinnan "to spin", stigqan "to thrust", swiltan "to die", ana-trimpan "to tread on", atþinsan "to attract", þriskan "to thresh", wilwan "to rob", windan "to wind", winnan "to suffer", gawrisqan "to bear fruit";
 Class 3, before h, ƕ, r: baírgan "to keep", ufgaírdan "to gird up", ƕaírban "to walk", afswaírban "to wipe out", gaþaírsan "to wither", waírpan "to throw", waírþan "to become";
 Class 4a: brikan "to break", niman "to take", qiman "to come", stilan "to steal", ga-timan "to suit";
 Class 4a, before h, ƕ, r: baíran "to bear", ga-taíran "to destroy";
 Class 4b: trudan "to tread";
 Class 5: diwan "to die" (dáu), fitan "to travail in birth", giban "to give" (gaf), bi-gitan "to find", hlifan "to steal", ligan "to lie down", lisan "to gather", mitan "to measure", ganisan "to be saved", niþan "to help", qiþan "to say", rikan "to heap up", sitan "to sit", sniwan "to hasten" (snáu), gawidan "to bind" (gawaþ), gawigan "to shake down", wisan "to be, remain", wrikan "to persecute";
 Class 5, j-present: bidjan "to pray"
 Class 5, irregular: fraíƕnan "to ask"; itan "to eat";
 Class 5; before h, ƕ, r: saíƕan "to see";
 Class 5; before h, ƕ, r; -n- present: fraíhnan "to ask";
 Class 6: alan "to grow", usanan "to expire", ga-daban "to beseem" (gadōf), ga-draban "to hew out" (ga-drōf), ga-dragan "to heap up", faran "to go", graban "to dig" (grōf), af-hlaþan "to lade", malan "to grind", sakan "to rebuke", skaban "to shave" (skōf), slahan "to smite", swaran "to swear", þwahan "to wash", wakan "to wake";
 Class 6, -j- present: fraþjan "to understand", hafjan "to raise", hlahjan "to laugh", ga-raþjan "to count", ga-skapjan "to create", skaþjan "to injure", wahsjan "to grow";
 Class 6, irregular: standan "to stand" (stōþ);
 Class 7a; -a- present: us-alþan "to grow old", blandan "to mix", falþan "to fold", gaggan "to go" (past supplied by iddja), haldan "to hold", anapraggan "to oppress", saltan "to salt", gastaldan "to possess", waldan "to rule";
 Class 7a; -ā- present: fāhan "to seize", hāhan "to hang";
 Class 7a; -ái- present: afáikan "to deny", fráisan "to tempt", háitan "to call", láikan "to leap", máitan "to cut", skáidan "to divide" (skaískáiþ), gaþláihan "to cherish, comforẗ";
 Class 7a; -ē- present: uf-blēsan "to blow up, puff up", slēpan "to sleep";
 Class 7a; -ō- present: blōtan "to worship", *flōkan "to bewail", ƕōpan "to boast";
 Class 7a; -au- present: *lauan "to revile" (*laílō); possibly also *bnauan "to rub", which may be a Class III weak verb (see below);
 Class 7a; -áu- present: áukan "to add", hláupan "to leap", stáutan "to smite";
 Class 7b; -ē- present: grētan "to weep", lētan "to let", garēdan "to reflect upon" (garaírōþ), tēkan "to touch";
 Class 7b; -ai- present: saian "to sow", *waian "to blow".

The following is a sample paradigm of a strong verb, niman "to take" (Class 4):

Weak verbs
Weak verbs in Germanic languages are defined by the past tense being formed by a suffix, rather than the stem vowel changing. In the case of Gothic, further subclasses are defined by the vowel that comes before the past-tense prefix, as well as other forms of the verb. Generally, the present tense, infinitive, and imperative share the same personal suffixes with strong verbs.

The following table outlines the common past-tense suffix between weak verbs; note that a thematic vowel is always used before this suffix:

Class 1 
Class 1 verbs are defined by having the thematic vowel -i-; which becomes -j- before vowels and becomes -ei- after long stems before -i-. The following is a sample paradigm of two class 1 weak verbs, nasjan "to save" (short stem-syllable), and sōkjan "to seek" (long stem-syllable; only differing forms shown):

Some class 1 verbs have an irregular past due to the fact that the -i- in the past was lost in Proto-Germanic:

gaggan is properly a Class 7 strong verb. iddja is declined like a weak verb. A weak past gaggida also occurs once.
briggan is properly a Class 3 strong verb, with other parts taken from a lost verb *braggjan (cf. Old English breng(e)an, Old Saxon brengian).

Class 2 

Class 2 weak verbs are defined by having the thematic vowel -ō-.

The following is a sample paradigm of a class 2 weak verb, salbōn "to anoint":

Class 3 

Class 3 weak verbs are marked by having the vowels -a- and -ái- as the thematic vowels. The two thematic vowels are used differently depending on form, with only -ái- being used in the past tense.

The following is a sample paradigm of a class 3 weak verb, haban "to have":

Class 3 is apparently a closed class, containing only the following verbs:

áistan "to reverence", ana-silan "to be silent", andstaúrran "to murmur against", arman "to pity", bauan "to dwell", fastan "to fast, hold firm", fijan "to hate", gageigan "to gain", gakunnan "to recognize", haban "to have", hatan "to hate", jiukan "to contend", leikan "to please", liban "to live", liugan "to marry", maúrnan "to mourn", munan "to consider", reiran "to tremble", saúrgan "to sorrow", sifan "to rejoice", skaman (sik) "to be ashamed", slawan "to be silent", trauan "to trust", swēran "to honour", þahan "to be silent", witan "to watch, observe".

Possibly also *bnauan "to rub" belongs here—only the present participle occurs, which is not enough to tell whether this is a Class 3 weak verb or Class 7 strong verb.

Notes:
bauan "to dwell" was originally a Class 7 strong verb (cf. Old Icelandic būa "to dwell", past singular bjō, past participle būenn), and the third singular present indicative is still normally bauiþ, a strong form (vs. *bauáiþ, the expected weak form).
hatan also occurs as a Class 1 weak verb hatjan.

Class 4 

Class 4 weak verbs have the suffix -n, in addition to a thematic vowel -ō- in the past tense. In all other tenses, the suffix -n is used before strong verb suffixes.

The following is a sample paradigm of a class 4 weak verb, fullnan "to become full":

Preterite-present verbs

So-called "preterite-present verbs" are a feature of Germanic languages that have a present tense formed like the past tense (or "preterite") of strong verbs. The verbs often have the semantics of modal verbs, and in fact the present-day English modal verbs "can, could, may, might, shall, should, must" are descended from Old English preterite-present verbs. The past tense of these verbs is a new formation and has the endings of weak verbs. Arguably, all seven classes of strong verbs are represented in Gothic by at least one preterite-present verb.

The following table presents almost all extant forms of each of the existing preterite-present verbs in Gothic. Many of the missing forms can be derived from existing forms as the number of principal parts is small—in fact, three is usually enough: First/third person singular present indicative, first (or third) person plural present indicative, first/third person singular past indicative. However, occasional small irregularities may occur, and the table below errs on the side of under-generalization. Forms with an *italicized asterisk are reconstructions based on knowledge of other forms or forms from other Germanic languages.

Furthermore, present participles are given a gloss, since the participle often has an unpredictable meaning; especially when the verb in question is inherently intransitive. *ōgan ("to fear") is the only verb in the group known to have an imperative.

Stem-final -g- in magan, ōgan, and áigan is often changed to -h-, especially before voiceless consonants. Áigan has the derivative faír-áigan ("to partake of").

Presumed verbal stems, given the extant forms:

"Present 1" refers to the indicative present singular personal forms, and "Present 2" refers to all other forms in the present; as well as the imperative and infinitive.

Presumed subject suffixes, given the extant forms:

Irregular verbs

Suppletive verbs

Wisan, "to be" 
This highly irregular verb derives from two different Proto-Indo-European roots by suppletion; see Indo-European copula for more.

Briggan, "to bring"

Gaggan, "to go"

Wiljan, "to want/will" 
This irregular verb derives from the fossilized optative mood of a Proto-Indo-European verb (not to be confused with the Gothic mood known as optative, which corresponds to the subjunctive mood of PIE and other Germanic languages).

Irregular strong verbs

Fraíhnan, "to ask"

Itan, "to eat"

Standan, "to stand"

Irregular weak verbs

Brūkjan, "to use"

Bugjan, "to buy"

Káupatjan, "to slap"

Þagkjan, "to think"

Þugkjan, "to seem"

Waúrkjan, "to work"

See also 
 Gothic language
 Grammar of the Gothic Language
 Proto-Indo-European verb:
 Ancient Greek grammar
 Latin conjugation
 Sanskrit verbs

References
 
 

Verbs
Indo-European verbs